In Loving Memory Of... is the debut studio album by American-Canadian rock band Big Wreck. Released in 1997, the album features the single "The Oaf," which became a Top Ten hit in the U.S. Subsequent singles, "That Song" and "Blown Wide Open", found airplay in the United States but experienced greater success in Canada where they both reached the Top Ten on the country's alternative chart. "Under the Lighthouse" was released as a single exclusively in Canada.

In Loving Memory Of... features layered progressive elements in addition to its heavy Southern rock style. Lyrically, it deals predominantly with relationship issues. Frontman Ian Thornley noted, "The majority of the album is actually written about one girl. Somebody who's still fucking me up." He also admitted that the track "Look What I Found" was intended to sound like Soundgarden as a reference to how popular bands gain fame emulating other groups.

To promote their debut album, Big Wreck opened for progressive metal band Dream Theater in what was their first major national tour.

In 2018, Big Wreck embarked on a 35-date North American tour to celebrate the 20th anniversary of In Loving Memory Of..., in which they performed every song from the album at each show. The album was also reissued the same year with new artwork and two previously unreleased outtakes from the recording sessions. This reissue also saw the album's first vinyl press.

Track listing

"Fall Through the Cracks" and "Overemphasizing" were produced by Chris Wardman.

Personnel
Ian Thornley — vocals, lead guitar, mando guitar, keyboards, drums (on "By the Way")
Brian Doherty — guitar
David Henning — bass
Forrest Williams — drums

Charts
Singles

References

1997 debut albums
Big Wreck albums
Atlantic Records albums